The Forestry and Agricultural Biotechnology Institute (FABI) (Pretoria) was established in 1997 and is located on the University of Pretoria campus. The goal of the institute is to help the development of novel food and fibre crops, that will clearly contribute to global economic development and food security.

FABI was involved in 2011 in the completion of the eucalyptus tree genome (Eucalyptus grandis).

Research Areas

Agricultural and Forest Biotechnology 
Forest Entomology and Forest Pathology 
Agricultural Plant Pathology and Entomology 
Biological Control of Fungal Pathogens and Insect Pests 
Microbial Bioinformatics and Phylogenetics 
Mycology and Fungal Biodiversity

External links
 The Forestry and Agricultural Biotechnology Institute web site
 University of Pretoria web site

University of Pretoria
Biotechnology organizations
Research institutes in South Africa
Forestry in South Africa
Organizations established in 1997